Menegazzia dielsii is a species of foliose lichen from New Zealand. It was first formally described by German lichenologist Johannes Hillmann in 1940. Rolf Santesson transferred it to the genus Menegazzia in 1943. It contains several lichen products: atranorin, conpsoromic acid, echinocarpic acid, and psoromic acid.

See also
List of Menegazzia species

References

dielsii
Lichen species
Lichens described in 1942
Lichens of New Zealand
Taxa named by Johannes Hillmann